The 2015 American Athletic Conference women's basketball tournament was an postseason women's tournament was held March 6–9, 2015, in the Mohegan Sun Arena in Uncasville, Connecticut and will decide the champion of the 2014–15 American Athletic Conference women's basketball season. The teams in the conference will compete in an eleven team single elimination tournament with the addition of Tulsa and Tulane for an automatic bid to the 2015 NCAA tournament. UConn beat South Florida in the final 84–70 to win its second straight AAC tournament championship.

Seeds
All the teams in the American Athletic Conference will qualify for the tournament. Teams are seeded based on conference record and then a tie breaker system is used. Teams seeded 6-11 will have to play in the opening round and teams seeded 1-5 receive a bye to the quarterfinals.

Schedule
All tournament games are nationally televised on an ESPN network:

Bracket

References

American Athletic Conference women's basketball tournament
2014–15 American Athletic Conference women's basketball season
2015 in sports in Connecticut
College basketball tournaments in Connecticut
Sports competitions in Uncasville, Connecticut